Peavine may refer to:
Merrimac, California, formerly Peavine
Peavine, Oklahoma 
Peavine Peak
West Peavine, Oklahoma
any of several plants in the genus Lathyrus
Vicia americana, Great Basin plant in the Pea family